The 2003–04 Nashville Predators season was the Nashville Predators' sixth season in the National Hockey League (NHL). The team qualified for the Stanley Cup playoffs for the first time in franchise history, losing to the Detroit Red Wings in the first round.

Off-season

Regular season

The Predators had the most power-play opportunities of all 30 teams in the League, with 428.

Final standings

Playoffs

Schedule and results

Regular season

|- align="center" bgcolor="#CCFFCC" 
|1||W||October 9, 2003||3–1 || align="left"|  Mighty Ducks of Anaheim (2003–04) ||1–0–0–0 || 
|- align="center" bgcolor="#FFBBBB"
|2||L||October 11, 2003||1–3 || align="left"|  Dallas Stars (2003–04) ||1–1–0–0 || 
|- align="center" bgcolor="#CCFFCC" 
|3||W||October 16, 2003||4–1 || align="left"|  St. Louis Blues (2003–04) ||2–1–0–0 || 
|- align="center" bgcolor="#CCFFCC" 
|4||W||October 18, 2003||3–2 || align="left"|  Columbus Blue Jackets (2003–04) ||3–1–0–0 || 
|- align="center" bgcolor="#FFBBBB"
|5||L||October 19, 2003||1–3 || align="left"| @ Chicago Blackhawks (2003–04) ||3–2–0–0 || 
|- align="center" bgcolor="#FFBBBB"
|6||L||October 23, 2003||2–4 || align="left"| @ Atlanta Thrashers (2003–04) ||3–3–0–0 || 
|- align="center" bgcolor="#FFBBBB"
|7||L||October 25, 2003||3–5 || align="left"|  Colorado Avalanche (2003–04) ||3–4–0–0 || 
|- align="center" bgcolor="#FFBBBB"
|8||L||October 28, 2003||0–1 || align="left"| @ St. Louis Blues (2003–04) ||3–5–0–0 || 
|- align="center" bgcolor="#CCFFCC" 
|9||W||October 30, 2003||5–3 || align="left"|  Detroit Red Wings (2003–04) ||4–5–0–0 || 
|-

|- align="center" 
|10||T||November 1, 2003||1–1 OT|| align="left"|  Dallas Stars (2003–04) ||4–5–1–0 || 
|- align="center" bgcolor="#FFBBBB"
|11||L||November 2, 2003||3–7 || align="left"| @ Dallas Stars (2003–04) ||4–6–1–0 || 
|- align="center" bgcolor="#FFBBBB"
|12||L||November 5, 2003||3–4 || align="left"|  Vancouver Canucks (2003–04) ||4–7–1–0 || 
|- align="center" bgcolor="#FFBBBB"
|13||L||November 7, 2003||1–2 || align="left"|  Chicago Blackhawks (2003–04) ||4–8–1–0 || 
|- align="center" bgcolor="#CCFFCC" 
|14||W||November 8, 2003||4–3 || align="left"| @ Detroit Red Wings (2003–04) ||5–8–1–0 || 
|- align="center" bgcolor="#CCFFCC" 
|15||W||November 13, 2003||4–1 || align="left"|  Calgary Flames (2003–04) ||6–8–1–0 || 
|- align="center" bgcolor="#CCFFCC" 
|16||W||November 15, 2003||4–3 || align="left"|  New York Islanders (2003–04) ||7–8–1–0 || 
|- align="center" bgcolor="#FFBBBB"
|17||L||November 19, 2003||0–3 || align="left"| @ Los Angeles Kings (2003–04) ||7–9–1–0 || 
|- align="center" bgcolor="#CCFFCC" 
|18||W||November 21, 2003||4–3 OT|| align="left"| @ Mighty Ducks of Anaheim (2003–04) ||8–9–1–0 || 
|- align="center" bgcolor="#FFBBBB"
|19||L||November 22, 2003||1–3 || align="left"| @ San Jose Sharks (2003–04) ||8–10–1–0 || 
|- align="center" bgcolor="#CCFFCC" 
|20||W||November 24, 2003||3–2 || align="left"| @ Colorado Avalanche (2003–04) ||9–10–1–0 || 
|- align="center" bgcolor="#CCFFCC" 
|21||W||November 26, 2003||4–2 || align="left"|  Columbus Blue Jackets (2003–04) ||10–10–1–0 || 
|- align="center" bgcolor="#CCFFCC" 
|22||W||November 28, 2003||2–1 || align="left"| @ Boston Bruins (2003–04) ||11–10–1–0 || 
|- align="center" bgcolor="#CCFFCC" 
|23||W||November 29, 2003||4–1 || align="left"|  Buffalo Sabres (2003–04) ||12–10–1–0 || 
|-

|- align="center" bgcolor="#CCFFCC" 
|24||W||December 3, 2003||2–1 OT|| align="left"| @ Carolina Hurricanes (2003–04) ||13–10–1–0 || 
|- align="center" bgcolor="#CCFFCC" 
|25||W||December 4, 2003||4–2 || align="left"| @ Columbus Blue Jackets (2003–04) ||14–10–1–0 || 
|- align="center" bgcolor="#FFBBBB"
|26||L||December 6, 2003||1–4 || align="left"| @ St. Louis Blues (2003–04) ||14–11–1–0 || 
|- align="center" bgcolor="#FFBBBB"
|27||L||December 11, 2003||1–4 || align="left"|  Los Angeles Kings (2003–04) ||14–12–1–0 || 
|- align="center" 
|28||T||December 13, 2003||2–2 OT|| align="left"|  Florida Panthers (2003–04) ||14–12–2–0 || 
|- align="center" bgcolor="#FF6F6F"
|29||OTL||December 16, 2003||1–2 OT|| align="left"|  Vancouver Canucks (2003–04) ||14–12–2–1 || 
|- align="center" bgcolor="#FF6F6F"
|30||OTL||December 18, 2003||4–5 OT|| align="left"| @ Montreal Canadiens (2003–04) ||14–12–2–2 || 
|- align="center" bgcolor="#CCFFCC" 
|31||W||December 20, 2003||1–0 || align="left"|  Detroit Red Wings (2003–04) ||15–12–2–2 || 
|- align="center" 
|32||T||December 22, 2003||3–3 OT|| align="left"|  Phoenix Coyotes (2003–04) ||15–12–3–2 || 
|- align="center" 
|33||T||December 23, 2003||3–3 OT|| align="left"| @ Minnesota Wild (2003–04) ||15–12–4–2 || 
|- align="center" bgcolor="#FFBBBB"
|34||L||December 26, 2003||1–2 || align="left"| @ Dallas Stars (2003–04) ||15–13–4–2 || 
|- align="center" bgcolor="#CCFFCC" 
|35||W||December 27, 2003||3–1 || align="left"| @ Phoenix Coyotes (2003–04) ||16–13–4–2 || 
|- align="center" bgcolor="#FFBBBB"
|36||L||December 29, 2003||2–5 || align="left"| @ San Jose Sharks (2003–04) ||16–14–4–2 || 
|-

|- align="center" bgcolor="#CCFFCC" 
|37||W||January 1, 2004||3–2 || align="left"|  Pittsburgh Penguins (2003–04) ||17–14–4–2 || 
|- align="center" bgcolor="#CCFFCC" 
|38||W||January 3, 2004||3–2 || align="left"|  New Jersey Devils (2003–04) ||18–14–4–2 || 
|- align="center" bgcolor="#FFBBBB"
|39||L||January 5, 2004||0–6 || align="left"| @ Detroit Red Wings (2003–04) ||18–15–4–2 || 
|- align="center" bgcolor="#FFBBBB"
|40||L||January 6, 2004||1–2 || align="left"| @ Toronto Maple Leafs (2003–04) ||18–16–4–2 || 
|- align="center" bgcolor="#CCFFCC" 
|41||W||January 8, 2004||4–3 OT|| align="left"|  Colorado Avalanche (2003–04) ||19–16–4–2 || 
|- align="center" bgcolor="#CCFFCC" 
|42||W||January 10, 2004||3–1 || align="left"|  St. Louis Blues (2003–04) ||20–16–4–2 || 
|- align="center" 
|43||T||January 12, 2004||3–3 OT|| align="left"| @ Minnesota Wild (2003–04) ||20–16–5–2 || 
|- align="center" 
|44||T||January 13, 2004||0–0 OT|| align="left"|  Los Angeles Kings (2003–04) ||20–16–6–2 || 
|- align="center" bgcolor="#CCFFCC" 
|45||W||January 15, 2004||4–3 || align="left"|  Phoenix Coyotes (2003–04) ||21–16–6–2 || 
|- align="center" bgcolor="#CCFFCC" 
|46||W||January 17, 2004||2–1 || align="left"|  Edmonton Oilers (2003–04) ||22–16–6–2 || 
|- align="center" bgcolor="#CCFFCC" 
|47||W||January 19, 2004||2–0 || align="left"|  Minnesota Wild (2003–04) ||23–16–6–2 || 
|- align="center" bgcolor="#FFBBBB"
|48||L||January 22, 2004||0–4 || align="left"| @ Calgary Flames (2003–04) ||23–17–6–2 || 
|- align="center" bgcolor="#CCFFCC" 
|49||W||January 24, 2004||4–3 || align="left"| @ Edmonton Oilers (2003–04) ||24–17–6–2 || 
|- align="center" bgcolor="#FFBBBB"
|50||L||January 25, 2004||1–4 || align="left"| @ Vancouver Canucks (2003–04) ||24–18–6–2 || 
|- align="center" bgcolor="#CCFFCC" 
|51||W||January 29, 2004||6–4 || align="left"| @ Columbus Blue Jackets (2003–04) ||25–18–6–2 || 
|- align="center" bgcolor="#CCFFCC" 
|52||W||January 31, 2004||3–2 OT|| align="left"|  San Jose Sharks (2003–04) ||26–18–6–2 || 
|-

|- align="center" bgcolor="#FFBBBB"
|53||L||February 3, 2004||1–4 || align="left"|  Detroit Red Wings (2003–04) ||26–19–6–2 || 
|- align="center" bgcolor="#FFBBBB"
|54||L||February 5, 2004||2–5 || align="left"|  Tampa Bay Lightning (2003–04) ||26–20–6–2 || 
|- align="center" bgcolor="#FFBBBB"
|55||L||February 11, 2004||2–5 || align="left"| @ Chicago Blackhawks (2003–04) ||26–21–6–2 || 
|- align="center" bgcolor="#CCFFCC" 
|56||W||February 13, 2004||5–2 || align="left"|  Washington Capitals (2003–04) ||27–21–6–2 || 
|- align="center" 
|57||T||February 15, 2004||2–2 OT|| align="left"|  Edmonton Oilers (2003–04) ||27–21–7–2 || 
|- align="center" bgcolor="#FFBBBB"
|58||L||February 16, 2004||2–4 || align="left"| @ Columbus Blue Jackets (2003–04) ||27–22–7–2 || 
|- align="center" bgcolor="#CCFFCC" 
|59||W||February 18, 2004||7–3 || align="left"|  San Jose Sharks (2003–04) ||28–22–7–2 || 
|- align="center" bgcolor="#CCFFCC" 
|60||W||February 20, 2004||3–2 OT|| align="left"| @ Mighty Ducks of Anaheim (2003–04) ||29–22–7–2 || 
|- align="center" bgcolor="#CCFFCC" 
|61||W||February 21, 2004||8–2 || align="left"| @ Phoenix Coyotes (2003–04) ||30–22–7–2 || 
|- align="center" bgcolor="#FFBBBB"
|62||L||February 23, 2004||0–3 || align="left"| @ Los Angeles Kings (2003–04) ||30–23–7–2 || 
|- align="center" bgcolor="#CCFFCC" 
|63||W||February 26, 2004||4–0 || align="left"|  Minnesota Wild (2003–04) ||31–23–7–2 || 
|- align="center" bgcolor="#CCFFCC" 
|64||W||February 28, 2004||2–1 OT|| align="left"|  New York Rangers (2003–04) ||32–23–7–2 || 
|-

|- align="center" 
|65||T||March 1, 2004||2–2 OT|| align="left"|  Chicago Blackhawks (2003–04) ||32–23–8–2 || 
|- align="center" bgcolor="#FFBBBB"
|66||L||March 3, 2004||2–5 || align="left"| @ Philadelphia Flyers (2003–04) ||32–24–8–2 || 
|- align="center" bgcolor="#CCFFCC" 
|67||W||March 4, 2004||9–4 || align="left"| @ Pittsburgh Penguins (2003–04) ||33–24–8–2 || 
|- align="center" bgcolor="#FFBBBB"
|68||L||March 6, 2004||2–4 || align="left"| @ Ottawa Senators (2003–04) ||33–25–8–2 || 
|- align="center" bgcolor="#FFBBBB"
|69||L||March 9, 2004||2–3 || align="left"|  Boston Bruins (2003–04) ||33–26–8–2 || 
|- align="center" 
|70||T||March 11, 2004||1–1 OT|| align="left"| @ St. Louis Blues (2003–04) ||33–26–9–2 || 
|- align="center" 
|71||T||March 13, 2004||4–4 OT|| align="left"|  Calgary Flames (2003–04) ||33–26–10–2 || 
|- align="center" bgcolor="#FF6F6F"
|72||OTL||March 14, 2004||2–3 OT|| align="left"| @ Detroit Red Wings (2003–04) ||33–26–10–3 || 
|- align="center" 
|73||T||March 16, 2004||2–2 OT|| align="left"| @ Vancouver Canucks (2003–04) ||33–26–11–3 || 
|- align="center" bgcolor="#FFBBBB"
|74||L||March 19, 2004||4–5 || align="left"| @ Edmonton Oilers (2003–04) ||33–27–11–3 || 
|- align="center" bgcolor="#CCFFCC" 
|75||W||March 20, 2004||3–1 || align="left"| @ Calgary Flames (2003–04) ||34–27–11–3 || 
|- align="center" bgcolor="#FFBBBB"
|76||L||March 23, 2004||1–4 || align="left"|  Mighty Ducks of Anaheim (2003–04) ||34–28–11–3 || 
|- align="center" bgcolor="#CCFFCC" 
|77||W||March 25, 2004||4–2 || align="left"| @ New York Rangers (2003–04) ||35–28–11–3 || 
|- align="center" bgcolor="#FF6F6F"
|78||OTL||March 27, 2004||2–3 OT|| align="left"|  Columbus Blue Jackets (2003–04) ||35–28–11–4 || 
|- align="center" bgcolor="#CCFFCC" 
|79||W||March 30, 2004||5–2 || align="left"|  Chicago Blackhawks (2003–04) ||36–28–11–4 || 
|-

|- align="center" bgcolor="#CCFFCC" 
|80||W||April 1, 2004||3–1 || align="left"| @ Chicago Blackhawks (2003–04) ||37–28–11–4 || 
|- align="center" bgcolor="#FFBBBB"
|81||L||April 3, 2004||1–4 || align="left"|  St. Louis Blues (2003–04) ||37–29–11–4 || 
|- align="center" bgcolor="#CCFFCC" 
|82||W||April 4, 2004||2–1 OT|| align="left"| @ Colorado Avalanche (2003–04) ||38–29–11–4 || 
|-

|-
| Legend:

Playoffs

|- align="center" bgcolor="#FFBBBB"
| 1 || April 7 || Nashville || 1–3 || Detroit ||  || Legace || 20,066 || Red Wings lead 1–0 || 
|- align="center" bgcolor="#FFBBBB"
| 2 || April 10 || Nashville || 1–2 || Detroit || || Legace || 20,066 || Red Wings lead 2–0 || 
|- align="center" bgcolor="#CCFFCC"
| 3 || April 11 || Detroit || 1–3 || Nashville ||  || Legace || 17,113 || Red Wings lead 2–1 || 
|- align="center" bgcolor="#CCFFCC"
| 4 || April 13 || Detroit || 0–3 || Nashville || || Legace || 17,113 || Series tied 2–2 || 
|- align="center" bgcolor="#FFBBBB"
| 5 || April 15 || Nashville || 1–4 || Detroit || || Joseph || 20,066 || Red Wings lead 3–2 || 
|- align="center" bgcolor="#FFBBBB"
| 6 || April 17 || Detroit || 2–0 || Nashville || || Joseph || 17,329 || Red Wings win 4–2 || 
|-

|-
| Legend:

Player statistics

Scoring
 Position abbreviations: C = Center; D = Defense; G = Goaltender; LW = Left Wing; RW = Right Wing
  = Joined team via a transaction (e.g., trade, waivers, signing) during the season. Stats reflect time with the Predators only.
  = Left team via a transaction (e.g., trade, waivers, release) during the season. Stats reflect time with the Predators only.

Goaltending

Awards and records

Awards

Transactions
The Predators were involved in the following transactions from June 10, 2003, the day after the deciding game of the 2003 Stanley Cup Finals, through June 7, 2004, the day of the deciding game of the 2004 Stanley Cup Finals.

Trades

Players acquired

Players lost

Signings

Draft picks
Nashville's draft picks at the 2003 NHL Entry Draft held at the Gaylord Entertainment Center in Nashville, Tennessee.

Farm teams
Milwaukee Admirals (AHL)
Toledo Storm (ECHL)

See also
2003–04 NHL season

Notes

References

 
 
 

Nash
Nash
Nashville Predators seasons